The La Vega raid was a police raid that occurred on 8 January 2021 in La Vega Parish, Caracas, Venezuela. The objective of the raid was to take control of La Vega Parish, which was controlled by a criminal organization, led by Leonardo José Polanco Angulo; he was a crime boss, known as "El Loco Leo". Members of the Venezuelan National Police (PNB), the Special Action Forces (FAES) and the Venezuelan National Guard seized control of the parish, killing a number of people in the neighborhood. According to investigative journalists and human rights organizations, the death toll was 23 people. By 11 January, no member of the Nicolás Maduro administration had made a statement about the events or announced a death toll.

Background 
In June 2019, the United Nations High Commissioner for Human Rights, Michelle Bachelet, documented dozens of extrajudicial killings in Venezuela and included among her report's recommendations to disband the Special Action Forces (FAES) and open an independent investigation of their actions. Few days after the report was published, Nicolás Maduro appeared publicly with FAES officers, praising them. Although Maduro's administration alleged that the report was plagued with "falsehoods", it has worked along Bachelet's Office. On a September 2020 update of the human rights situation of Venezuela, Bachelet stressed FAES' actions again and informed that according to the Public Ministry, seventy FAES officers had been indicted in several states.

A United Nations fact-finding mission, which said that Nicolas Maduro's government had committed systematic human rights violations amounting to crimes against humanity, called in 2020 for the FAES to be disbanded due to its role in extrajudicial killings.

Events 
In January 2021, police information found that members of the mega-gang that operates in Cota 905 in Caracas and the El Loco Leo gang in El Valle Parish attempted to rise up against the local authority to turn it into a no-go area.

In the morning of 8 January, commissions of the Venezuelan National Police (PNB), of the Special Action Forces (FAES) and the Venezuelan National Guard took control of La Vega Parish in Caracas. Police came in with agents in motorcycles, armored vehicles and one light tank. According to police sources, all the deceased had criminal background or were in police registries, but relatives assured that many were arrested after raiding their homes and that they were later executed. Witnesses declared that many of the victims that were identified in Caracas'  were first alive at the moment of the arrest. There did not appear to be any police deaths from the confrontations.

As of 11 January, the Maduro administration had not made a statement about the events nor announced a death toll. Attorney General Tarek William Saab and the Interior Affairs Minister did not respond to comment requests by BBC Mundo. Neither Venezuela's information ministry nor the chief prosecutor's office immediately replied to requests for comment by Reuters.

The NGO Monitor de Víctimas (Victims Monitor) unofficially registered 24 deaths and identified 10 people, three of whom were minors; according to a report by Runrunes, "they would not be able to have funerals and would be taken directly to the cemetery". The outlet also reported that "several of the burials would be paid by the state". Former prosecutor and director of the Public Ministry, Zair Mundaray, declared that the bodies of the deceased had a "ballistic pattern that indicates extrajudicial killings".

The human rights organization PROVEA, declared that at least 23 people died during the operation, described the events as a "massacre" and asked the Ombudsman, Alfredo Ruiz, to offer explanations about the events and to file a complaint. Marino Alvarado, investigation coordinator of the organizations, declared that the relatives of the victims started to denounce the detention of people to be executed afterwards.

References 

2021 in Venezuela
21st century in Caracas
January 2021 events in Venezuela
Law enforcement in Venezuela
Massacres in 2021
Massacres in Venezuela
Crisis in Venezuela
2021 crimes in Venezuela